Halieutopsis is a fish genus in the family Ogcocephalidae.

Species
There are currently seventeen recognized species in this genus:
 Halieutopsis andriashevi Bradbury, 1988 (Andriashev's deepsea batfish)
 Halieutopsis bathyoreos Bradbury, 1988 (Broad-snout deepsea batfish)
 Halieutopsis echinoderma H. C. Ho, 2022 (Spiny deepsea batfish)
 Halieutopsis galatea Bradbury, 1988 (Galathea deepsea batfish)
 Halieutopsis ingerorum Bradbury, 1988 (Ingers’ deepsea batfish)
 Halieutopsis kawaii H. C. Ho, 2022 (Kawai's deepsea batfish)
 Halieutopsis margaretae H. C. Ho & K. T. Shao, 2007 (Margaret's deepsea batfish)
 Halieutopsis murrayi H. C. Ho, 2022 (Murray's deepsea batfish) Etymology. The species is named after Sir John Murray (1841–1914) in recognition of his contributions to modern oceanography and with reference to the John Murray Expedition, during which the holotype was collected.
 Halieutopsis nasuta (Alcock, 1891)  (Big-nosed deepsea batfish)
 Halieutopsis nudiventer (Lloyd, 1909)  (Naked-belly deepsea batfish)
 Halieutopsis oblonga (H. M. Smith & Radcliffe, 1912)  (Oblong deepsea batfish)
 Halieutopsis okamurai  H. C. Ho, 2022 (Okamura's deepsea batfish) Etymology. This species is named after the late Dr. Osamu Okamura (Professor Emeritus, BSKU), who collected the specimen, in recognition of his remarkable contributions to the study of deep-sea fishes, especially the gadiform fishes.
 Halieutopsis simula H. M. Smith & Radcliffe, 1912 (Fluffy-esca deepsea batfish)
 Halieutopsis stellifera H. M. Smith & Radcliffe, 1912 (Starry deepsea batfish)
 Halieutopsis taiwanea  H. C. Ho, 2022 (Taiwan deepsea batfish)
 Halieutopsis tumifrons Garman, 1899 (Truncate-snout deepsea batfish)
 Halieutopsis vermicularis H. M. Smith & Radcliffe, 1912

References

Ogcocephalidae
Marine fish genera
Taxa named by Samuel Garman